David Harold Richardson Fairey (born 17 August 1940) is a former English cricketer.  Fairey was a right-handed batsman who bowled left-arm medium-pace.  Born in Linton, Cambridgeshire, he was also a field hockey player.

Fairey made his debut for Cambridgeshire in the 1957 Minor Counties Championship against Hertfordshire.  Fairey played Minor counties cricket for Cambridgeshire from 1957 to 1979, which included 88 Minor Counties Championship matches.  In 1964, he made his List A debut against Essex in the Gillette Cup.  He played five further List A matches for Cambridgeshire, the last coming against Northamptonshire in 1975.  In his six List A matches, he scored 72 runs at a batting average of 14.40, with a high score of 22.  With the ball he took 3 wickets at a bowling average of 20.33, with best figures of 2/8.

Outside of cricket, he played field hockey for Cambridgeshire and England.  Fairey's father-in-law, Maurice Crouch, played List A and Minor counties cricket for Cambridgeshire, as well as first-class cricket for other teams.

References

External links
David Fairey at ESPNcricinfo
David Fairey at CricketArchive

1940 births
Living people
People from Linton, Cambridgeshire
English cricketers
Cambridgeshire cricketers
English male field hockey players